Dato' Chai Kim Sen (Chinese: 蔡金星, 1963/1964 – 15 March 2021) was a Malaysian politician who served as a two-term Senator of the Dewan Negara from 2014 to 2020. A member of the Malaysian Chinese Association (MCA), he was also the party's Deputy Secretary-General, as well as the Chairman of the party's Seputeh division.

Biography
Chai was born in Kuala Kangsar, Perak, and studied business at Kolej Tunku Abdul Rahman (now Tunku Abdul Rahman University College). He was married and had 2 children.

Death
He died on 15 March 2021 due to cancer at the age of 57. A source has reported that he never informed his cancer to others.

Honours
 :
 Member of the Order of the Defender of the Realm (AMN) (2007)
 :
 Knight Companion of the Order of the Crown of Pahang (DIMP) – Dato' (2006)

See also

 Members of the Dewan Negara, 13th Malaysian Parliament
 List of politicians of Chinese descent

References 

1960s births
2021 deaths
Year of birth uncertain
People from Perak
Malaysian politicians of Chinese descent
Malaysian Chinese Association politicians
Members of the Dewan Negara
Deaths from cancer in Malaysia
21st-century Malaysian politicians
Members of the Order of the Defender of the Realm